José Andrés Rodríguez Gaitán, commonly known as Andy (born 30 January 1990), is a Spanish footballer who plays for Burgos CF as a midfielder.

Club career
Born in Almuñécar, Granada, Andalusia, Andy finished his graduation at Real Madrid's youth setup, and started playing as a senior with the C-team in the 2009–10 campaign, in Tercera División. On 5 August 2012 he moved to Levante UD, being assigned to the reserves in Segunda División B.

On 8 July 2014, after scoring a career-best 11 goals, Andy signed a one-year deal with Segunda División's SD Ponferradina. He played his first match as a professional on 24 August, starting in a 1–0 home win against CD Tenerife.

Andy scored his first professional goal on 13 September 2014, netting his side's second in a 3–1 away win against CD Numancia. He ended the season with six goals, being an ever-present figure as his side finished one point shy of the play-offs.

On 3 July 2018, free agent Andy signed for UD Logroñés in division three, and helped in their first-ever promotion to the second division in 2020. On 3 July 2021, after the club's relegation, he moved to Burgos CF also in the second tier.

Personal life
Andy's younger brother Fran is also a footballer. A right back, he too was groomed at Real Madrid.

References

External links

1990 births
Living people
Spanish footballers
Footballers from Almuñécar
Association football midfielders
Segunda División players
Segunda División B players
Tercera División players
Real Madrid C footballers
Atlético Levante UD players
SD Ponferradina players
UD Logroñés players
Burgos CF footballers